David Bigham (born 4 July 1971) is a British athlete. He competed in the men's decathlon at the 1992 Summer Olympics.

References

External links
 

1971 births
Living people
Athletes (track and field) at the 1992 Summer Olympics
British decathletes
Olympic athletes of Great Britain
People from Walthamstow
Athletes from London